Jake the Alligator Man is an alleged half-man, half-alligator creature on display in apparently mummified condition at Marsh's Free Museum, a tourist trap located at 409 South Pacific Avenue in Long Beach, Washington. He was acquired by the museum for $750 in 1967 from an antique store.

A postcard image was used by the Weekly World News on November 9, 1993 for the front-page article "Half-human, half-alligator discovered in Florida swamp".

Jake has acquired a cult following in Northwestern popular culture. His 75th birthday party is held annually in early August on the peninsula, and features events such as a bachelor party, car show, bridal contest, and live music.

See also
Fiji mermaid
Jenny Haniver

References

External links
Official site

1993 hoaxes
Hoaxes in the United States
Washington (state) culture
Pacific County, Washington